Niklas Sjökvist (born July 20, 1970) is a Swedish former ice hockey player. He is the father of proplayer Tobias Sjökvist.

Career
In 1986 Sjökvist made his debut for Bofors IK for which he played in Division 1 and Division 2. He played for Örebro IK and IF Troja-Ljungby in Division 1. In 1996 he started playing for Färjestad BK in the Elitserien, he won two Swedish titles with them. In his first season in the Elitserien he became Rookie of the Year. He stopped playing in 2000 after an injury. In 2002-2003 he was an assistant-coach at Färjestad BK.

Career statistics

Regular season and playoffs

References

External links

1970 births
Living people
Färjestad BK players
Swedish ice hockey centres
People from Karlskoga Municipality
Sportspeople from Örebro County